Autobiography of Mistachuck is the debut solo studio album by Public Enemy frontman Chuck D. It was released on October 22, 1996, via Mercury Records. It peaked at #190 on the Billboard 200. The album spawned one single, "No."

Track listing

Charts

References

Chuck D albums
1996 debut albums
Mercury Records albums